Malindi Marine National Park is located in the Indian Ocean, off the coast of Kenya. It is claimed to be oldest marine park in Africa. The park  lies at Malindi, about 118 km north of Mombasa and is protected and administered by the Kenya Wildlife Service. Along with Watamu Marine National Park, Malindi Marine Park is enclosed by the Malindi Marine National Reserve.

Wildlife
The park's attractions include coral reefs, tropical fish, barracuda, turtles and dolphins.

References
 Kenya Wildlife Service: Malindi Marine National Park

National parks of Kenya
Biosphere reserves of Kenya
Protected areas established in 1968
1968 establishments in Kenya
Kilifi County
East African coral coast